Desert Wedding (French: Les noces de sable) is a 1948 French drama film directed by André Zwoboda and starring Denise Cardi, Larbi Tounsi and Himmoud Brahimi. Location shooting took place in the Atlas Mountains of French Morocco. It was originally screened at the 1948 Venice Film Festival before being released in France the following year. The narration was spoken by filmmaker Jean Cocteau. In the United States it was released in 1952 by DisCina with the alternative title of Daughter of the Sands.

Cast
 Denise Cardi as La princesse
 Larbi Tounsi as Le prince
 Himmoud Brahimi as Le bouffon
 Bent Larsen as Le prince
 Jean Cocteau as Narrator

References

Bibliography 
 Rège, Philippe. Encyclopedia of French Film Directors, Volume 1. Scarecrow Press, 2009.
 Spaas, Lieve. Francophone Film: A Struggle for Identity. Manchester University Press, 2000.

External links 
 

1948 films
1948 drama films
French drama films
1940s French-language films
Films directed by André Zwoboda
Films shot in Morocco
Films set in Morocco
1940s French films